Tallgrass is a leading infrastructure company focused on safely, reliably, and sustainably delivering energy. Based in Kansas City, Kansas with an operational headquarters in Denver, Colorado, and a large office in Houston, Texas, the company operates over 10,000 miles of energy infrastructure assets across 15 states.

Tallgrass was founded in 2012 and traded on the New York Stock Exchange under the symbols “TEP”, “TEGP”, and “TGE” before it was taken private in 2020.

Tallgrass operates five FERC-regulated natural gas pipelines (Rockies Express, Ruby, Trailblazer, and Tallgrass Interstate Gas Transmission and Cheyenne Connector), and East Cheyenne Gas Storage. In addition, the company operates three FERC-regulated oil pipeline systems (Pony Express, Powder River Express and Iron Horse) as well as 8.3 million barrels of oil terminal storage. Since 2020, the company has developed a robust low carbon, clean fuels, and clean energy business inclusive of projects such as the conversion of the Trailblazer pipeline to CO2 service, their JV partnership to produce 2+ billion gallons of sustainable aviation fuel, and their investment in Escalante H2 Power (EH2 Power), a first-of-its-kind hydrogen-to-power project which is working to convert a retired coal-fired power plant to a clean hydrogen-fired power generation facility.

Matthew P. Sheehy was named President & Chief Executive Officer in 2022.

See also
 List of oil pipelines

References

External links
 Tallgrass Energy

American companies established in 2013
Energy companies established in 2013
Companies based in Overland Park, Kansas
Oil pipeline companies
Natural gas pipeline companies
Natural gas companies of the United States
Oil companies of the United States
Companies listed on the New York Stock Exchange